Sergey Vladimirovich Borisov (born 25 January 1983) is a Russian cyclist. He competed in the keirin and the men's team sprint at the 2012 Summer Olympics in London.

References

1983 births
Living people
Russian male cyclists
Cyclists at the 2012 Summer Olympics
Olympic cyclists of Russia
Sportspeople from Tula, Russia